The term bodega in Spanish can mean "pantry", "tavern", or "wine cellar". The derivative term bodegón is an augmentative that refers to a large bodega, usually in a derogatory fashion. In Spanish art, a bodegón is a still life painting depicting pantry items, such as victuals, game, and drink, often arranged on a simple stone slab, and also a painting with one or more figures, but with significant still life elements, typically set in a kitchen or tavern. It also refers to low-life or everyday objects, which can be painted with flowers, fruits, or other objects to display the painter's mastery.

History

Beginning in the Baroque period, such paintings became popular in Spain in the second quarter of the 17th century. The tradition of still life painting appears to have started and was far more popular in the contemporary Flemish and Dutch artists (Belgium and Netherlands today), than in southern Europe. Northern still lifes had many subgenres; the breakfast piece was augmented by the trompe-l'œil, the flower bouquet, and the vanitas. In Spain there were much fewer patrons for this sort of thing, but a type of breakfast piece did become popular, featuring a few objects of food and tableware laid on a table. Though now considered a Spanish invention, the classic trompe-l'œil presentation of fruit on a stone slab was common in ancient Rome.

Spanish Baroque still life painting were often austere; they differed from the Flemish Baroque still lifes, which often contain both rich banquets surrounded by ornate and luxurious items with fabric or glass. In bodegones, the game is often plain dead animals still waiting to be skinned. The fruits and vegetables are uncooked. The backgrounds are bleak or plain wood geometric blocks, often creating a surrealist air. Both Netherlandish and Spanish still lifes often had a moral vanitas element. Their austerity, akin to the bleakness of some of the Spanish plateaus, never copies the sensual pleasures, plenitude, and luxury of many Northern European still life paintings.

The Velázquez paintings The Waterseller of Seville, Old Woman Frying Eggs, and The lunch are often described as bodegones due to the artist's depiction of jars and foodstuff. Some people reject this use of the term, calling them instead a mixture of genre painting in Bamboccianti style and still life.

Motifs

References

Bibliography

 Nochlin, Linda' The Politics of Vision : Essays on Nineteenth-Century Art and Society. New York: Harper & Row, (1989). Page 30.
 JC Robinson: The Bodegones and Early Works of Velázquez, The Burlington Magazine for Connoisseurs,1906, page 172.

External links 
 
 

Visual arts genres
Spanish art
Spanish Baroque